The European Union Committee is a select committee of the House of Lords in the Parliament of the United Kingdom. Its terms of reference are "To consider European Union documents and other matters relating to the European Union", as well as "to represent the House as appropriate in interparliamentary co-operation within the European Union".

Much of the detailed scrutiny work on EU documents is conducted by the sub-committees, each dealing with a separate policy area. The main committee oversees the work of the sub-committees and approves their reports and scrutinises proposals that cross subject areas, such as the Treaty of Lisbon and the multiannual financial framework. Beginning in 2020, the committee has also focused on the implementation of the United Kingdom's withdrawal from the European Union.

Committee members represented the House of Lords at a number of different interparliamentary meetings, such as COSAC and joint committee meetings at the European Parliament. As part of their work representing the House in interparliamentary co-operation within the EU, the committees contribute to the IPEX database, which brings together information about national parliamentary scrutiny from all EU member states.

Select Committee membership
The Select Committee has nineteen members: the chairman, the chairmen of the sub-committees, and other members, all of whom also sit on sub-committees.

As of December 2022, the members of the main select committee are as follows:

Baroness Couttie ( Conservative) was a member of the EU Select Committee until her death in December 2022.

Scrutiny work
The UK Government deposits European documents, such as draft directives and communications from the European Commission, in parliament. These are then subjected to scrutiny by the EU Select Committee and its counterpart in the House of Commons, the European Scrutiny Committee. In the House of Lords system, each deposited document is sifted by subject area and importance for the Select Committee or one of the sub-committees to scrutinise carefully on an ongoing basis. The chairman of the Select Committee pursues any issues arising in correspondence with the responsible minister, and from time to time directly with the commission. This correspondence is publicly available.

Sub-committees
Prior to the start of the 2012−13 Session, the Select Committee had seven sub-committees. In May 2012, at the start of the new parliamentary session, the Select Committee restructured its sub-committees, eliminating the previous Sub-committee G (Social Policies and Consumer Protection) and revising the remits of the remaining six sub-committees. Shortly after the United Kingdom's withdrawal agreement with the EU went into effect in January 2020, the sub-committees were further reduced to five, merging the previous six sub-committees into four, and adding an International Agreements sub-committee. The International Agreements sub-committee was re-established as the separate International Agreements Committee in January 2021.

The current sub-committees are as follows:

Environment
The EU Environment Sub-committee examines the European Union's policies regarding the environment as well as agriculture, energy, climate change, food, fisheries, biosecurity, and overall public health. In addition, it considers the environmental impact of the UK−EU level playing field. The sub-committee largely replaces the previous EU Energy and Environment Sub-committee.

As of June 2020, the EU Environment Sub-committee's membership is:

Goods
The EU Goods Sub-committee considers the European Union's policies and legislative proposals, as well as ongoing negotiations between the United Kingdom and the European Union, regarding future trade in goods (including customs), level playing fields, consumer protections, public procurement and transport. The sub-committee replaces various aspects of the previous sub-committees on EU External Affairs and EU Internal Market.

As of May 2020, the EU Goods Sub-committee's membership is:

Security and Justice
The EU Security and Justice Sub-committee considers the United Kingdom's future relations with the EU regarding internal and external security, including criminal justice, policing, data-sharing, and defence. The sub-committee combines various aspects of the previous sub-committees on Home Affairs, External Affairs, and Justice.

As of April 2020, the EU Security and Justice Sub-committee's membership is:

Services
The EU Services Sub-committee considers policies related to the United Kingdom's relationship with the European Union in the areas of trading in financial and non-financial services, as well as science, education, and culture. The sub-committee largely replaces the previous sub-committee on Financial Affairs with additional roles from the sub-committee on Home Affairs.

As of December 2022, the EU Services Sub-committee's membership is:

Baroness Couttie ( Conservative) was a member of the EU Services Sub-committee until her death in December 2022.

External links
The records of the House of Lords European Union Committee are held by the UK Parliamentary Archives

See also

References

Committees of the House of Lords
United Kingdom and the European Union